Leggiuno is a town and comune in the province of Varese, Lombardy, Italy.

It is the birthplace of Gigi Riva, a footballer of Cagliari and  Italy. The great Italian operatic tenor Giuseppe Borgatti died there in retirement in 1950.

Main sights
The frazione of Reno is home to the hermitage of Santa Caterina del Sasso, which overlooks Lake Maggiore. Local tradition has it that it dates back to the 12th century and was founded by the hermit Alberto Besozzi. Though still in use as a monastery, it serves mainly as a tourist attraction and pilgrimage site.

References

Cities and towns in Lombardy
Varese